The Hill Nubian languages, also called Kordofan Nubian, are a dialect continuum of Nubian languages spoken by the Hill Nubians in the northern Nuba Mountains of Sudan.

Classification 
The Hill Nubian languages are generally classified as being in the Central branch of the Nubian languages, one of three branches of the Nubian languages, the other two being Northern (Nile), consisting of Nobiin, and Western (Darfur), consisting of Midob. They are grouped together with Kenzi-Dongolawi (not seen to be closely related to Nobiin, despite their proximity) and Birgid, a language of southwestern Sudan extinct since the 1970s. Nubian lies within the Eastern Sudanic family, which is part of the Nilo-Saharan phylum.

Languages 
There are seven Hill Nubian languages, according to Ethnologue and Glottolog. Some of the languages have dialects. Their internal classification within Hill Nubian is not well established. Glottolog classifies Hill Nubian (Kordofan Nubian) into two branches: Eastern Kordofan Nubian and Western Kordofan Nubian, containing three and four languages respectively. Ethnologue, however, only groups Kadaru and Ghulfan together, leaving the rest unclassified within Hill Nubian, as follows:
 Kadaru-Ghulfan
 Ghulfan (also Gulfan, Uncu, Uncunwee, Wunci, Wuncimbe) – 33,000 speakers
 Kadaru (also Kadaro, Kadero, Kaderu, Kodhin, Kodhinniai, Kodoro, Tamya) – 25,000 speakers
 Dair (also Dabab, Daier, Thaminyi) – 1,024 speakers
 Dilling (also Delen, Warkimbe, Warki) – 11,000 speakers
 El Hugeirat (also El Hagarat) – 50 speakers
 Karko (also Garko, Kaak, Karme, Kithonirishe, Kakenbi) – 7,000 speakers
 Wali (also Walari, Walarishe, Wele) – 9,000 speakers
Additionally, one extinct language known only from a word list of 36 words, Haraza, is unclassified within Hill Nubian.

List of Kordofan Nubian (Hill Nubian) language varieties according to Rilly (2010:164-165):

See also
Languages of the Nuba Mountains
List of Northern Eastern Sudanic reconstructions (Wiktionary)

References

External links
 Hill Nubian basic lexicon at the Global Lexicostatistical Database
 A collection of Tabaq in ELAR 
More information on specific linguistic characteristics and/or variations among Hill Nubian languages
 http://digitalcommons.fairfield.edu/djns/vol1/iss1/10 
 http://digitalcommons.fairfield.edu/djns/vol2/iss1/9
 http://digitalcommons.fairfield.edu/djns/vol2/iss1/13

Nubian languages
Languages of Sudan